Jagatdhatri or Jagaddhatri is an aspect of the Hindu goddess Parvati, worshipped in the Indian states of West Bengal and Odisha.Her worship and rituals are derived from Tantra, where she is a symbol of Sattva beside Durga and Kali, who are respectively symbols of Rajas and Tamas. It is believed, that her worship frees her devotees from ego and all other materialistic desires. 

According to the Purans, Jagadhatri is the incarnation of Siddhidhatri. She is also said to be the combined form of Sri Bhuvaneshwari and Durga. In Bengal, her puja is celebrated as the comeback of Devi, specifically in Krishnanagar, Chandannagar
, Rishra.

Legends
The legend of the goddess is found in the Kena Upanishad and the Katyayani Tantra. After the goddess Durga killed Mahishasura, the gods of Svarga forgot about her powers. So, in order to test them and teach them a lesson, Parvati appeared before Agni, Vayu, Varuna, and Chandra, who considered themselves invincible and were engulfed by a false sense of pride in themselves, ahamkara, the infallible ego. She asked them to take out and move a tiny blade of grass. Vayu failed to pluck it, and Agni failed to burn it. One by one, every god tried but failed to do the task. In the end, they understood that Devi is the source of all forms of power in the universe, and even theirs belonged to her. The Devas realized their misgivings and the goddess appeared before them as Uma, riding on a lion. The goddess gave the ego of the Devas, the form of an elephant. That is why Goddess Jagaddhatri is depicted sitting on a lion with an elephant under her. The elephant, symbolizing ahamkara, lies under the fierce paws of here vahana, the majestic lion, who symbolises courage, valour and the strength to overcome any challenges, including one's internal struggles with the Shada Ripus (meaning the six enemies).

This is where we find mention of Devi as Jagadhatri for the first time. She is told to be the manifestation of Saguna Bramha and symbol of Sattwa Guna. Even though the world is witnessing destruction and creation every moment but it never gets destroyed totally. The reason is the Maha Shakti who protects and sustains it. She's the eternal, unaffected by the waves of time. Devi Jagadhatri is the manifestation of that Maha Shakti.

"You must believe in the Ishwara rupa. Do you know the meaning of Jagadhatri rupa? She is carrying the world. If she stops then the world will get destroyed" is said by Sri Ramakrishna.

Her dhyana mantra describes her weapons, vahana and her Iconography. She is sitting atop a lion, wearing different jewelry, in her four hands Devi holds bow, arrow, chakra & Samkha. She is reddish like the rising sun and she is wearing a snake garland. Her reddish colour and weapons are the symbols of raja guna but this is not for destruction and going to war. Rather this is to keep the world focused on Ritam & Satyam.

She sustains the universe through her Yoga shakti. Naga/Sarpa is the symbol of Yoga & Upavitam is the symbol of Bramhin. Devi is yogini. She is using the world through her maha yoga shakti. The act of rescuing the world is her Lila.

In her stotram (Jagadhatri Strotram), she has been invoked as Adhara bhutah, Dhritirupah, Dhurandharah, Dhruvapadah, Shaktistah, Shaktirupah, Shaktacharpriyah, Shaktivigrahe.

History of Worship

There are variations regarding the history of worship of the goddess in Bengal. The popular narrative states that the worship was begun by Maharaja Krishnachandra of Krishnanagar, Nadia. However, as per local history, the worship of goddess Jagatdhatri was first established  by Chandrachur Tarkamani of Santipur who made an idol of the goddess at the behest of Raja Girishchandra. At the time only ghat puja was conducted at Krishnanagar, Nadia in Bengal. Idol worship of the goddess was initiated in the village of Bramhasason, which is located in Haripur in Santipur, Nadia. Furthermore, the Jaleshwara temple of Shantipur(1665) and Raghaveshwara temple(1669) have the idol of the goddess inside the sanctum sanctorum as well as carved on the temple walls. So, her worship may have been known in Nadia long before Krishna Chandra.
 

At Krishnanagar, Raj Rajeshwary Jagatdhatri Puja is one of the oldest in Bengal. As per local history, Maharaja Krishnachandra was arrested by Nawab Siraj-ud-Dullah once for not paying taxes on time. He was released from prison during the day of Vijaya Dashami. Having missed  the entire festivity of Durga Puja in his kingdom, Maharaja became extremely sad. Seeing her devotee sad, the ultimate mother, Goddess Jagaddhatri gave Maharaja a vision and the king commenced the ritual of Jagatdhatri Puja in his native place.The puja was performed by Raj Rajeshwary (Raj Mata in Bengali language) and before the start, a Jagatdhatri Puja was donated by Maharaja Krishna Chandra named Maa Jaleshwary at Malopara Barowary. The worship of the goddess was later resumed by Sarada Devi, wife of Ramakrishna.

The Jagatdhatri puja of Bose family, Palpara, deserves a special mention in this regard. The puja of this family initially used to be held in their ancestral home in Murshidabad. Folklore has it that this puja was started in 1788. The puja was later shifted to its present location in Chandannagar, where many of the family members now live. The exact history of the deity is unknown, but family records date it back to 1640.

Researcher Mohit Roy has noted that Jagadhatri vigraha from Barisal(BD) is from the 8th Century. Currently, the vigraha is in the Ashutosh Museum(Kolkata). One must note that such Simha-Vahini vigrahas have been discovered plenty, particularly from western Bengal.

The first textual mention of Jagadhatri puja comes from Kalviveka of Smarta Shulapani, dated approximately from 1375 to 1460.Later Smartas Brihaspati Raymukut and Srinatha Acharya Churamani have mentioned the goddess in their work.

The time in which she is worshipped, Shukla Paksha of the pious month of Kartika, especially the Tithi of Navami, is very auspicious. In ancient times, it was known as Chandika Puja. According to Smritisagara and Mahamohopadhhaya Panchanan Tarkaratna, it is the day to worship Uma.

The oldest temple of the goddess is in Somra (Hooghly), also known as Mahavidya temple. It was established in 1621 CE. The worship of the goddess takes place in the Dekhuria village as well in Birbhum. Still older is the Jagadhatri puja of Baligram village(Jiaganj, Murshidabad), dated back to five hundred years ago. Bandyopadhyay family of Mirhat of Kalna are observing Jagadhatri puja for more than four hundred years. Jagadhatri puja is the main Puja of Dhatrigram, Baidyapur & Mirhat of Kalna. The 350-year-old Chandrapati family's kuladevi is Jagrata, to say the least.

Festivities
	

Jagatdhatri Puja is very popular in Krishnanagar, (Sutragarh-Santipur), Tehatta, Rishra, Chandannagar, Bhadreswar, Hooghly, Boinchi, Ashoknagar-Kalyangarh, Kagram.

The beauty of the festival in Chandannagar is mainly due to the collaborative conception between the French and Bengalis. Remarkable feature remaining its procession, second largest in the world after Rio de Janeiro's, with its magnificent lightings

The Jagadhatri puja of Krishnanagar is a thing to see. During this time the city adorns itself with lots of lights, flowers, pandals and the likes. Each year more than 5 lakh devotees come to Krishnanagar to be a part of this grandiose festival. There are about 150-175 clubs and barowaris which organise Jagadhatri puja in the city. The Jagadhatri puja of Krishnagar is a perfect blending of devotion, emotion and celebration. The most popular Jagadhatri goddess is the Burima of Chasa Para(In Bengali Chasa means farmer). This deity is called the Tirupathi of Krishnanagar. Each year the idol is embellished with 150 kg gold and 150 kg silver ornaments with more than 10 benarasis and jamdanis. Besides Burima, Choto Ma (the deity of Kathalpota Barowari),Mejoma (the deity of College Street Barowari), Jaleswari (the idol of Malo para Barowari) are also very famous.

The Trinayani Jagadhatri Puja Committee started the first sarbojanin ( for all )Jagadhatri Puja in the Bankura district.  Although they started the first pujo in 2017, the first committee was formed in 2019. Here, the goddess Jagadhatri is known as Boroma.  On the Shukla Navami tithi in the month of Kartika (sometimes in Agrahayana), Trikalin Puja is performed . On the eleventh day, the mother idol is immersed in Padmapukur with Dhunuchi dance, with ancient Bengali dhaak and procession.  The main attraction of this pujo committee is that pujo is performed in a specific area but people from different locations of Bankura are associated with this pujo.  In their words, "Para jar jar Boroma Sobar".  Along with Pujo, this committee also does various social work.  West Bengal Chief Minister Mamata Banerjee was present in the mandapa as the chief guest of the Trinayani Jagadhatri Puja in 2020.  The Trinayani Jagadhatri Puja Committee is becoming popular among the people of Bankura.

Jagadhatri Mela

After Ratha Yatra, Jagadhatri Mela at Bhanjpur Jagadhatri Podia, is the biggest mela of Baripada, Odisha. It is the festival of Maa Jagadhatri, Goddess of the whole world. There is an 8–15 day mela (carnival) also known as mini Bali Jatra named after Cuttack's Bali Jatra which takes place at Jagadhatri Mela Podia, Bhanjpur, near the Bhanjpur railway Station during the month of October–November. It is celebrated on Gosthastami. It is also referred to as another Durga Puja as it also starts on Asthami tithi and ends on Dashami tithi. The date of the puja is decided by the luni-solar Hindu calendar.

In 2012, the sarbajanina Maa Jagadhatri puja has been started from 21 November. But the mela continued from 26 November to 7 December (for the first time it was for such a long period of 13 days). As the puja was celebrating its Diamond Jubilee for completing 60 years.

In 2013, the sarbajanina Maa Jagadhatri puja has been started on 11 November. But to commemorate the loss of Odisha, specifically Mayurbhanj district and Baripada due to Phailin and post Phailin flood, there will be no Cultural Program or Live telecast of this(2013) year's Jagadhatri Puja and Mela on Blue Sky (Local Cable Provider). But Mela will continue from 14 to 25 November 2013.

Every year its main attraction is the Puja Torana(Pendal) and the Mela. The Pendal is decorated as a famous monument in 2011 it was a miniature of US Capitol Building, United States. This year, it is Lalitha Mahal, Mysore. From the year 2000 it has been a tradition to decorate the torana as a special infrastructure. Tajmahal, Agra; Victoria Memorial (India), Kolkata; Titanic Ship; Lotus Temple, New Delhi; Golden Temple, Punjab etc. were also mimicked in the previous years since 2000 to 2006. As a tribute to 26/11 Hotel Taj Mahal Palace & Tower, Mumbai attack victims, the torana of the year 2009 is a lookalike of that hotel. The pictures are shown here are the toranas decorated from 2007 to 2012 as the previous year's pictures are not available.

In Literature 

Goddess Jagatdhatri figures in the historical fiction Anandamath written by Bengali novelist Bankim Chandra Chatterjee. It is the same literary work from which the national song of India Vande Mataram originates. In the novel, Kali, Durga, and Jagatdhatri are depicted as three aspects of 'Bharat Mata' (Mother India) - Jagatdhatri as the mother used to be, Kali as the mother now is, and Durga as the mother will be in future. The trio of goddesses are shown as the object of worship of a group of ascetics who form the protagonists of the story.

References

Further reading
 McDermott, Rachel Fell (2011). Revelry, Rivalry, and Longing for the Goddesses of Bengal: The Fortunes of Hindu Festivals

External links

How Chandannagar celebrates Jagadhatri Puja?: An article by Dr. Subhendu Prakash Chakrabarty 

Hindu goddesses
Forms of Parvati
Durga Puja
Religious festivals in India
Festivals in West Bengal
Festivals in Odisha
Hindu festivals
Bengali Hindu festivals
People from Odisha
Odia culture